There are about 372,905 listed buildings in England and 2.5% of these are Grade I. The districts of Oxfordshire are Oxford, Cherwell, South Oxfordshire, Vale of White Horse, and West Oxfordshire. As there are 381 Grade I listed buildings in the county they have been split into separate lists for each district.

 Grade I listed buildings in Cherwell (district)
 Grade I listed buildings in Oxford
 Grade I listed buildings in South Oxfordshire
 Grade I listed buildings in Vale of White Horse
 Grade I listed buildings in West Oxfordshire

See also
 :Category:Grade I listed buildings in Oxfordshire
 Grade II* listed buildings in Oxfordshire

References